Sabihuddin Ghausi   was an acclaimed Pakistani journalist and an activist for the cause of the community of journalism in Pakistan. According to one obituary, he was bold and he wrote what he thought was right.

Early life 
Ghausi was born in  Ahmedabad, in the state of Gujarat, India. His father was a sessions judge at Junagadh High Court and also served as revenue commissioner in Manavadar. After the partition in 1947, the family migrated to Pakistan. Ghausi received his B.A degree from Islamia College, Karachi and M.A degree from the University of Karachi. He began his career as an officer at  Habib Bank, but he resigned from the bank and joined journalism in 1970.

Career
Ghausi started his journalistic career joining Daily Sun, his first newspaper job in 1970. He also worked for Pakistan Press International (PPI), Business Recorder, Morning News and Muslim newspapers. Later he joined the daily Dawn (newspaper) in 1988 and worked there for past two decades.
He was respected for his credibility, courage and commitment by the Karachi's journalism community. He was elected four times as  president of Karachi Press Club and  two times as president of Karachi Branch of Pakistan Federal Union of Journalists.

Ghausi was  jailed during Zia-ul-Haq’s military rule and lost his job. He still remained active and also took part in protests against the former military ruler Pervez Musharraf’s crackdown on the media. He was also a good speaker, and he never hesitated to ask shocking questions.

Journalist Amir Zia wrote:

Death
He died in Karachi on 26 March 2009 at the age of 65.

See also
 List of Pakistani journalists

References

External links
 Karachi Press Club's website

1943 births
2009 deaths
Dawn (newspaper) people
Pakistani activists
Pakistani male journalists
University of Karachi alumni
Journalists from Karachi
Pakistani people of Gujarati descent